The Essex-Lopresti fracture is a fracture of the radial head with concomitant dislocation of the distal radio-ulnar joint and disruption of the interosseous membrane. The injury is named after Peter Essex-Lopresti who described it in 1951.

Descriptive image link

Cause
This fracture occurs in patients who have fallen from a height.

Diagnosis 
The injury can be difficult to diagnose initially as the attention is focused on the injury to the radial head, leading to the distal radio-ulnar injury being overlooked. The examination finding of tenderness of the distal radio-ulnar joint suggests an Essex-Lopresti injury in patients who have sustained high energy forearm trauma. Plain radiography shows the radial head fracture, with dorsal subluxation of the ulna often seen on lateral view of the pronated wrist.

Management 
The radial head fracture is usually managed by open reduction internal fixation; if the fracture is too comminuted, a radial head implant can be used. Excision of the radial head should be avoided, as the radius will migrate proximally leading to wrist pain and loss of pronation and supination of the wrist. Delayed treatment of the radial head fracture will also lead to proximal migration of the radius.

The distal radio-ulnar joint dislocation can be reduced by supination of the forearm, and may be pinned in place for 6 weeks to allow healing of the interosseous membrane.

References

External links

Bone fractures